Richard Foote Pedersen (February 21, 1925 – July 11, 2011) was an American diplomat who was a career Foreign Service Officer in the United States State Department and President of the American University in Cairo.

Early life
Pedersen was born in Miami, Arizona and served with the 44th Infantry in the European Theater of Operations during World War II. After the war, he earned a bachelor's degree in international relations from the College of the Pacific, followed by a master's degree from Stanford University and a doctorate from Harvard University.

Diplomatic career
From 1953 to 1969, Pedersen served in the United States Mission to the United Nations to the United Nations alongside Charles W. Yost. He served at the U.N. under five ambassadors, including Henry Cabot Lodge Jr. and Adlai Stevenson. From January 23, 1969 until July 26, 1973, Pedersen served as Counselor of the United States Department of State, during the Nixon Administration. In 1970, his phones were bugged by the Nixon White House, as part of an effort to investigate leaks about the Invasion of Cambodia.

United States Ambassador to Hungary
On July 24, 1973, Pedersen was appointed United States Ambassador to Hungary, and he presented his credentials on September 10, 1973. He left the post on March 26, 1975.

American University of Cairo
From 1977 until 1990, Pedersen served as the President of the American University of Cairo, and led efforts to have the University receive full higher education accreditation. During his tenure the university expanded.

Later years and death
Pederson died in Greenport, New York on July 11, 2011, at the age of 86.

References 

1925 births
2011 deaths
United States Army soldiers
United States Army personnel of World War II
American lawyers
Nixon administration personnel
Ambassadors of the United States to Hungary
University of the Pacific (United States) alumni
Stanford University alumni
Harvard University alumni
People from Miami, Arizona
People from Greenport, Suffolk County, New York
American expatriates in Egypt